Charles Auguste Désiré Filon (1800–1875) was a French historian. He became professor of history at Douai, at École normale supérieure, and eventually inspecteur d'académie in Paris. His son, Augustin was also distinguished in the field of learning.

His principal works were:
Histoire comparée de la France et de l'Angleterre (1832)
Histoire de l'Europe au XVIe siècle (1838)
La Diplomatie française sous Louis XV (1843)
Histoire de l'Italie méridionale (1849)
Histoire du Sinai romain (1850)
Histoire de la démocratie athénienne (1854).

References

External links
 

1800 births
1875 deaths
French male non-fiction writers
19th-century French historians
19th-century French male writers